The Kohler family of Wisconsin is a family notable for its prominence in business, society, and politics in the U.S. state of Wisconsin  during the 19th, 20th and 21st centuries. Its members include two Governors of Wisconsin, and the founder and executives of Kohler Co., a Wisconsin-based manufacturing and hospitality company.

Family tree
The following chart uses a modified d'Aboville numbering. The redundant leading 1 has been omitted.  The generation is shown by the number of digits in the descendant's index number.
 Child
 Grandchild
 Great-grandchild
 Great-great-grandchild

In the chart, direct descendants of John M. Kohler II are indicated with a blue or yellow background. Persons with Wikipedia biographies are indicated with a heavy border with a blue border for a deceased person and a green border for a living person.

List of notable members
Chronological by birth:
John Michael Kohler II (1844–1900) Patriarch
Walter Jodok Kohler Sr (1875–1940) son
Marie Christine Kohler (1876–1943) daughter
Walter Jodok Kohler Jr (1904–1976) grandson
Julilly House (1908–1976) granddaughter-in-law
Terry Jodok Kohler (1934–2016 ) great-grandson
Herbert Vollrath Kohler Jr (1939–2022) grandson
Marie House Kohler (1951– ) great-granddaughter
David Karger Kohler (1966– ) great-grandson

See also
List of United States political families - The Kohlers

References

 

 
Kohler Company
Business families of the United States
Families from Wisconsin
Family trees